Napeogenes is a genus of clearwing (ithomiine) butterflies, named by Henry Walter Bates in 1862. They are in the brush-footed butterfly family, Nymphalidae.

Species
Arranged alphabetically:
 Napeogenes achaea (Hewitson, 1869)
 Napeogenes apulia (Hewitson, 1858)
 Napeogenes benigna Weymer, 1899
 Napeogenes cranto C. & R. Felder, 1865
 Napeogenes duessa (Hewitson, 1859)
 Napeogenes flossina Butler, 1873
 Napeogenes glycera Godman, 1899
 Napeogenes gracilis Haensch, 1905
 Napeogenes harbona (Hewitson, 1869)
 Napeogenes inachia (Hewitson, 1855)
 Napeogenes juanjuiensis Fox & Real, 1971
 Napeogenes larilla (Hewitson, 1877)
 Napeogenes larina (Hewitson, 1856)
 Napeogenes lycora (Hewitson, 1870)
 Napeogenes peridia (Hewitson, 1854)
 Napeogenes pharo (C. & R. Felder, 1862)
 Napeogenes quadrilis Haensch, 1903
 Napeogenes rhezia (Geyer, [1834])
 Napeogenes sodalis Haensch, 1905
 Napeogenes stella (Hewitson, 1855)
 Napeogenes sulphureophila Bryk, 1937
 Napeogenes sylphis (Guérin-Méneville, [1844])
 Napeogenes tawaman Brevignon, 2007
 Napeogenes tolosa (Hewitson, 1855)
 Napeogenes verticilla (Hewitson, 1874)

References

Ithomiini
Nymphalidae of South America
Taxa named by Henry Walter Bates
Nymphalidae genera